Michele Zukovsky (née Bloch) (born December 2, 1942) is an American clarinetist and longest serving female woodwind player in the history of the Los Angeles Philharmonic Orchestra, serving from 1961 at the age of 18 until her retirement on December 20, 2015.

Background
Born and raised in the Los Feliz and Franklin Hills neighborhood of Los Angeles, she played alongside and later succeeded her father, Kalman Bloch, as the principal clarinetist of the L.A. Philharmonic.

She is related through her mother Frances to famed violin virtuoso Jascha Heifetz.

Her brother Gregory Bloch (deceased 1988) played violin and mandolin for the Italian rock band Premiata Forneria Marconi (PFM), the American progressive-rock bands String Cheese and It's a Beautiful Day, on "Gilda LIve" on Broadway, and with the Saturday Night Live Band.

Career 
Zukovsky has performed worldwide, including with the Boston Pops, the St. Petersburg String Quartet, the Lincoln Center Chamber Players, and at the Mostly Mozart Festival. She taught at the California Institute of the Arts. She currently teaches clarinet at Azusa Pacific University.

She premiered John Williams' Clarinet Concerto with the Boston Pops in 1991. In 1986, she premiered a version by Luciano Berio of the Sonata in F minor, Op. 120 #1, by Johannes Brahms, arranged for clarinet and orchestra under commission from the Los Angeles Philharmonic Orchestra.

As a recording artist, Zukovsky has released several works, including the most recent Simeon Bellison: The Arrangements for Clarinet (Summit Records, 2008), a compilation recording that includes arrangements by the Russian-American Simeon Bellison and Jewish-themed works by other composers.

As a film industry studio clarinetist, Zukovsky played of several films scored by John Williams.

She served on the faculty of the Thornton School of Music at the University of Southern California and the Pasadena Conservatory of Music. 

Zukovsky is applied faculty of clarinet at Azusa Pacific University in California.

References

External links
 

1942 births
American clarinetists
Women clarinetists
Living people
21st-century clarinetists
21st-century American women musicians
Summit Records artists
People from Los Feliz, Los Angeles